Muldestausee is a municipality in the district of Anhalt-Bitterfeld, in Saxony-Anhalt, Germany. It was formed on 1 January 2010 by the merger of the former municipalities Burgkemnitz, Friedersdorf, Gossa, Gröbern, Krina, Mühlbeck, Muldenstein, Plodda, Pouch, Rösa, Schlaitz and Schwemsal.

The municipality consists of the Ortschaften or municipal divisions Burgkemnitz, Friedersdorf, Gossa, Gröbern, Krina, Mühlbeck, Muldenstein, Plodda, Pouch, Rösa, Schlaitz, Schmerz and Schwemsal. Its seat is in the village Pouch.

References

 
Anhalt-Bitterfeld